Screen or Screens may refer to:

Arts
 Screen printing (also called silkscreening), a method of printing
 Big screen, a nickname associated with the motion picture industry
 Split screen (filmmaking), a film composition paradigm in which multiple distinct film sequences are shown simultaneously and next to each other
 Stochastic screening and Halftone photographic screening, methods of simulating grays with one-color printing

Filtration and selection processes
 Screening (economics), the process of identifying or selecting members of a population based on one or more selection criteria
 Screening (biology), idem, on a scientific basis,
 of which a genetic screen is a procedure to identify a particular kind of phenotype
 the Irwin screen is a toxicological procedure
 Sieve, a mesh used to separate fine particles from coarse ones
 Mechanical screening, a unit operation in material handling which separates product into multiple grades by particle size

Media and music
 "Screen", a song by Twenty One Pilots from Vessel
 Screen International, a film magazine covering the international film markets
 Screen (journal), a film and television studies journal published by Oxford University Press
 Screen (magazine), a weekly entertainment magazine from India
 The Screen (cinematheque), a theatre in Santa Fe, New Mexico, US
 Screenonline, online film and television magazine produced by the British Film Institute
 Screens (album), a 2009 album by Mint Chicks
 Screen (Australian TV series), Australian television series on Foxtel Arts channel 
 "Screens", a song by Weezer from their 2021 album OK Human

Media display
 Electronic visual display, a cathode ray tube or liquid crystal display (LCD)
 Touchscreen, a display device that also takes input via embedded pressure sensors
 Projection screen, a viewing surface
 Display device, an output device for presentation of information in visual form
 Computer monitor, a monitor for use with a computer
 Television set, a device that combines a tuner, display, and loudspeakers

Barriers, separation or partitioning
 Window screen, a plastic or wire mesh that covers a window opening
 Screen door, a mesh, wire or plastic, that covers a door opening
 Fire screen, a device to put in front of a fireplace
 Windbreak of trees or shrubs
 Windshield (windscreen), protects the driver of a vehicle
 Folding screen, a piece of decorative furniture
 Rainscreen, in building construction
 Rood screen, a partition in a church which separates the chancel from the nave
 Smoke screen, smoke released in order to mask the movement or location of military units
 Parclose screen, a partition in a church, separate from the Rood screen

Software
 GNU Screen, a computer program which multiplexes computer terminals
 Another name for "dynpro" in ABAP programs
 Screen (image blending), a blending method for digital images
Yahoo! Screen, a video streaming service

Sports
 Screen (sports), when a player obstructs the vision or motion of another player
 Screen (ice hockey), obstruction of a goaltender's view of the puck
 Screen pass, a type of offensive play in American football

Other
 Screen (bridge), a device used in some Bridge games that visually separates partners at the table from each other
 Electronic page, an interface, scene, page, or group of content on an electronic display device
 Pat Screen, Louisiana State University football player and Mayor-President of East Baton Rouge Parish, Louisiana
 The conductive screen around the inner conductor(s) of an electrical cable, usually either foil or braided wire
 "The Verdant Braes of Screen", an Irish song in which the name Screen refers to Ballinascreen in County Londonderry, Northern Ireland
 SCREEN Holdings, a Japanese company in the technology manufacturing sector

See also
 Screening (disambiguation)
 
 
 Skreen, village in County Sligo, Ireland